Robert Alan Dwyer (born 5 October 1952) is an English former professional footballer who played as a left-back. He made 180 league appearances for Wrexham in the 1970s and 1980s.

Career
Dwyer would be discovered by Wrexham's scouting team whilst playing for Halewood Youth Club in his hometown of Liverpool. Initially signed as a forward, Wrexham manager John Neal would move him to left-back.

His biggest success came in the 1977–78 season where he help Wrexham win the Third Division.

He left Wrexham in 1981, eventually ending up at Stockport County, however injury prevented him from a regular first team place, and he eventually move to non-league Oswestry Town.

References

1952 births
Living people
English footballers
Association football defenders
Wrexham A.F.C. players
Stockport County F.C. players
Oswestry Town F.C. players
English Football League players